There are about 340 known moth species of Eritrea. The moths (mostly nocturnal) and butterflies (mostly diurnal) together make up the taxonomic order Lepidoptera.

This is a list of moth species which have been recorded in Eritrea.

Arctiidae
Aloa moloneyi (Druce, 1887)
Alpenus maculosa (Stoll, 1781)
Alpenus nigropunctata (Bethune-Baker, 1908)
Alpenus schraderi (Rothschild, 1910)
Amata magnopupillata Berio, 1941
Amata magrettii Berio, 1937
Amerila roseomarginata (Rothschild, 1910)
Amerila vitrea Plötz, 1880
Apisa canescens Walker, 1855
Apisa subcanescens Rothschild, 1910
Automolis pallida (Hampson, 1901)
Caripodia fusca Berio, 1939
Cyana puella (Drury, 1773)
Lepista arabica (Rebel, 1907)
Macrosia fumeola (Walker, 1854)
Metarctia haematricha Hampson, 1905
Metarctia lateritia Herrich-Schäffer, 1855
Metarctia pumila Hampson, 1909
Metarctia unicolor (Oberthür, 1880)
Micralarctia punctulatum (Wallengren, 1860)
Nyctemera apicalis (Walker, 1854)
Paralpenus ugandae (Hampson, 1916)
Paralpenus wintgensi (Strand, 1909)
Secusio somalensis Hampson, ????
Seydelia geometrica (Oberthür, 1883)
Spilosoma metaleuca (Hampson, 1905)
Teracotona proditrix (Berio, 1939)
Teracotona pruinosa de Joannis, 1912
Teracotona rhodophaea (Walker, 1865)
Teracotona subterminata Hampson, 1901
Thyretes negus Oberthür, 1878
Utetheisa amhara Jordan, 1939
Utetheisa pulchella (Linnaeus, 1758)

Bombycidae
Ocinara ficicola (Westwood & Ormerod, 1889)

Brahmaeidae
Dactyloceras richinii Berio, 1940

Carposinidae
Carposina chersodes Meyrick, 1915

Cossidae
Azygophleps inclusa (Walker, 1856)

Crambidae
Cotachena smaragdina (Butler, 1875)

Eupterotidae
Hoplojana abyssinica Rothschild, 1917
Hoplojana distincta Rothschild, 1917
Janomima dannfelti (Aurivillius, 1893)
Janomima mariana (White, 1843)
Phiala alba Aurivillius, 1893
Phiala longilinea Berio, 1939

Geometridae
Chiasmia turbulentata (Guenée, 1858)
Nychiodes tyttha Prout, 1915
Scopula beccarii (Prout, 1915)
Scopula lactaria (Walker, 1861)
Xylopteryx emunctaria (Guenée, 1858)
Zamarada euryscaphes Prout, 1915
Zamarada torrida D. S. Fletcher, 1974

Gracillariidae
Metriochroa inferior (Silvestri, 1914)
Phyllocnistis citrella Stainton, 1856

Lasiocampidae
Beralade perobliqua Walker, 1855
Beriola anagnostarai (Berio, 1939)
Bombycopsis indecora (Walker, 1865)
Eucraera magna (Aurivillius, 1908)
Eucraera minor (Gaede, 1915)
Odontopacha kilwana Strand, 1911
Philotherma clara Bethune-Baker, 1908
Philotherma rosa (Druce, 1887)
Schausinna affinis Aurivillius, 1910
Sena mendax (Berio, 1939)
Streblote acaciae (Klug, 1829)
Streblote badaglioi (Berio, 1937)
Streblote nyassanum (Strand, 1912)
Streblote polydora (Druce, 1887)

Limacodidae
Coenobasis postflavida Hampson, 1910
Crothaema flava Berio, 1940
Latoia chlorea Berio, 1939
Parasa lanceolata Hering, 1928

Lymantriidae
Bracharoa impurata de Joannis, 1913
Bracharoa reducta Hering, 1926
Casama hemippa Swinhoe, 1906
Crorema collenettei Hering, 1932
Dasychira daphne Hering, 1926
Dasychira plesia Collenette, 1939
Knappetra fasciata (Walker, 1855)
Laelia extorta (Distant, 1897)
Laelia promissa Berio, 1940
Naroma signifera Walker, 1856
Polymona rufifemur Walker, 1855
Stracilla translucida (Oberthür, 1880)

Noctuidae
Abrostola brevipennis (Walker, 1858)
Acantholipes circumdata (Walker, 1858)
Achaea catella Guenée, 1852
Achaea finita (Guenée, 1852)
Achaea infinita (Guenée, 1852)
Achaea lienardi (Boisduval, 1833)
Achaea mercatoria (Fabricius, 1775)
Acontia antica Walker, 1862
Acontia carnescens (Hampson, 1910)
Acontia hoppei Hacker, Legrain & Fibiger, 2008
Acontia hortensis Swinhoe, 1884
Acontia insocia (Walker, 1857)
Acontia opalinoides Guenée, 1852
Acontia psaliphora (Hampson, 1910)
Acontia semialba Hampson, 1910
Acontia transfigurata Wallengren, 1856
Acontia viridivariegata Berio, 1939
Acontia wahlbergi Wallengren, 1856
Aegocera brevivitta Hampson, 1901
Aegocera rectilinea Boisduval, 1836
Agrotis biconica Kollar, 1844
Agrotis incommodoides Berio, 1950
Agrotis lividoradiata Berio, 1940
Agrotis longiclava (de Joannis, 1913)
Agrotis metathoracica Berio, 1939
Agrotis pictifascia (Hampson, 1896)
Agrotis putativa Berio, 1941
Agrotis segetum ([Denis & Schiffermüller], 1775)
Amazonides axyliaesimilis (Berio, 1939)
Amazonides fumicolor (Hampson, 1902)
Amyna axis Guenée, 1852
Amyna punctum (Fabricius, 1794)
Androlymnia clavata Hampson, 1910
Anomis flava (Fabricius, 1775)
Anomis sabulifera (Guenée, 1852)
Anomis tamsi Berio, 1940
Antarchaea fragilis (Butler, 1875)
Anticarsia rubricans (Boisduval, 1833)
Antitype africana Berio, 1939
Argyrogramma signata (Fabricius, 1775)
Ariathisa abyssinia (Guenée, 1852)
Ariathisa semiluna (Hampson, 1909)
Asota speciosa (Drury, 1773)
Athetis aeschrioides Berio, 1940
Athetis biumbrosa Berio, 1940
Athetis satellitia (Hampson, 1902)
Athetis tetraglypha Berio, 1939
Aucha melaleuca Berio, 1940
Audea melaleuca Walker, 1865
Audea postalbida Berio, 1954
Autoba olivacea (Walker, 1858)
Brevipecten calimanii (Berio, 1939)
Busseola fusca (Fuller, 1901)
Calliodes appollina Guenée, 1852
Callixena barbara (Berio, 1940)
Callopistria yerburii Butler, 1884
Caradrina atriluna Guenée, 1852
Caradrina edentata (Berio, 1941)
Catephia mesonephele Hampson, 1916
Cerocala illustrata Holland, 1897
Cetola vicina de Joannis, 1913
Chasmina tibialis (Fabricius, 1775)
Chrysodeixis chalcites (Esper, 1789)
Condica capensis (Guenée, 1852)
Crameria amabilis (Drury, 1773)
Craniophora hemileuca Berio, 1941
Cyligramma latona (Cramer, 1775)
Digama africana Swinhoe, 1907
Digama aganais (Felder, 1874)
Digama meridionalis Swinhoe, 1907
Diparopsis castanea Hampson, 1902
Drasteria yerburyi (Butler, 1892)
Dysgonia algira (Linnaeus, 1767)
Dysgonia torrida (Guenée, 1852)
Engusanacantha bilineata Berio, 1941
Entomogramma pardus Guenée, 1852
Ericeia inangulata (Guenée, 1852)
Ethiopica phaeocausta Hampson, 1916
Eublemma ecthaemata Hampson, 1896
Eublemma leucozona Hampson, 1910
Eublemma mesozona Hampson, 1914
Eublemma olmii Berio, 1937
Eublemma parvisi Berio, 1940
Eublemma quadrilineata Moore, 1881
Eublemma quinarioides Berio, 1947
Eublemma staudingeri (Wallengren, 1875)
Eudocima fullonia (Clerck, 1764)
Eudocima materna (Linnaeus, 1767)
Euneophlebia pruinosa Berio, 1940
Euplexia augens Felder & Rogenhofer, 1874
Eustrotia accentuata Berio, 1950
Eustrotia trigonodes Hampson, 1910
Eutelia discitriga Walker, 1865
Eutelia mima Prout, 1925
Euxoa cymograpta Hampson, 1918
Feliniopsis consummata (Walker, 1857)
Feliniopsis minnecii (Berio, 1939)
Grammodes euclidioides Guenée, 1852
Grammodes stolida (Fabricius, 1775)
Helicoverpa zea (Boddie, 1850)
Heliothis richinii (Berio, 1939)
Heraclia superba (Butler, 1875)
Heteropalpia cortytoides Berio, 1939
Heteropalpia exarata (Mabille, 1890)
Heteropalpia vetusta (Walker, 1865)
Hypena obacerralis Walker, 1859
Hypocala subsatura Guenée, 1852
Hypotacha raffaldii Berio, 1939
Leucania albimacula (Gaede, 1916)
Leucania bisetulata (Berio, 1940)
Leucania longivittata Berio, 1940
Leucania loreyi (Duponchel, 1827)
Leucania mediolacteata (Berio, 1941)
Leucania melanostrota (Hampson, 1905)
Lithacodia blandula (Guenée, 1862)
Lophotavia incivilis Walker, 1865
Lygephila mommereti (Berio, 1940)
Marathyssa cuneata (Saalmüller, 1891)
Masalia disticta (Hampson, 1902)
Masalia flavistrigata (Hampson, 1903)
Masalia leucosticta (Hampson, 1902)
Masalia transvaalica (Distant, 1902)
Mentaxya albifrons (Geyer, 1837)
Mentaxya ignicollis (Walker, 1857)
Mentaxya muscosa Geyer, 1837
Mentaxya rimosa (Guenée, 1852)
Micraxylia delicatula (Berio, 1939)
Mitrophrys menete (Cramer, 1775)
Mocis mayeri (Boisduval, 1833)
Mythimna combinata (Walker, 1857)
Mythimna natalensis (Butler, 1875)
Odontestra avitta Fawcett, 1917
Odontestra richinii Berio, 1940
Odontestra variegata Berio, 1940
Oedicodia limbata Butler, 1898
Oligia ambigua (Walker, 1858)
Omphalestra nellyae (Berio, 1939)
Ophisma albitermia (Hampson, 1910)
Ophiusa dianaris (Guenée, 1852)
Ophiusa rectificata (Berio, 1841)
Ophiusa tettensis (Hopffer, 1857)
Ophiusa tirhaca (Cramer, 1777)
Oraesia emarginata (Fabricius, 1794)
Ozarba adducta Berio, 1940
Ozarba atrifera Hampson, 1910
Ozarba captata Berio, 1940
Ozarba cryptica Berio, 1940
Ozarba domina (Holland, 1894)
Ozarba exoplaga Berio, 1940
Ozarba heliastis (Hampson, 1902)
Ozarba lepida Saalmüller, 1891
Ozarba megaplaga Hampson, 1910
Ozarba mortua Berio, 1940
Ozarba nigroviridis (Hampson, 1902)
Ozarba phaea (Hampson, 1902)
Ozarba rubrivena Hampson, 1910
Ozarba semipurpurea (Hampson, 1902)
Ozarba separabilis Berio, 1940
Ozarba sinua Hampson, 1910
Ozarba terribilis Berio, 1940
Ozarba timida Berio, 1940
Ozarba variabilis Berio, 1940
Pandesma anysa Guenée, 1852
Pericyma mendax (Walker, 1858)
Phyllophila richinii Berio, 1940
Phytometra pentheus Fawcett, 1916
Plecopterodes gandolfii Berio, 1939
Polydesma scriptilis Guenée, 1852
Polydesma umbricola Boisduval, 1833
Protarache polygrapha Berio, 1950
Pseudozarba mesozona (Hampson, 1896)
Pseudozarba opella (Swinhoe, 1885)
Radara subcupralis (Walker, [1866])
Rougeotia calumniosa (Berio, 1939)
Serrodes partita (Fabricius, 1775)
Sesamia calamistis Hampson, 1910
Sphingomorpha chlorea (Cramer, 1777)
Spodoptera cilium Guenée, 1852
Spodoptera exempta (Walker, 1857)
Spodoptera exigua (Hübner, 1808)
Spodoptera littoralis (Boisduval, 1833)
Spodoptera mauritia (Boisduval, 1833)
Stilbotis dubium (Berio, 1939)
Syngrapha circumflexa (Linnaeus, 1767)
Timora turtur Berio, 1939
Tracheplexia richinii Berio, 1973
Tracheplexia viridisparsa (Berio, 1939)
Trichoplusia ni (Hübner, [1803])
Trichoplusia orichalcea (Fabricius, 1775)
Tricraterifrontia xanthiata Berio, 1940
Trigonodes exportata Guenée, 1852
Trigonodes hyppasia (Cramer, 1779)
Tytroca leucoptera (Hampson, 1896)
Vittaplusia vittata (Wallengren, 1856)

Nolidae
Arcyophora longivalvis Guenée, 1852
Arcyophora patricula (Hampson, 1902)
Blenina squamifera (Wallengren, 1860)
Characoma adiabunensis Berio, 1940
Earias biplaga Walker, 1866
Earias cupreoviridis (Walker, 1862)
Earias insulana (Boisduval, 1833)
Earias richinii Berio, 1940
Leocyma candace Fawcett, 1916
Maurilia arcuata (Walker, [1858])
Xanthodes albago (Fabricius, 1794)

Notodontidae
Anaphe reticulata Walker, 1855
Antheua aurifodinae (Distant, 1902)
Antheua simplex Walker, 1855
Antheua ungulata (Berio, 1939)
Antheua woerdeni (Snellen, 1872)
Phalera imitata Druce, 1896
Thaumetopoea apologetica Strand, 1909

Saturniidae
Aurivillius arata (Westwood, 1849)
Bunaea alcinoe (Stoll, 1780)
Bunaeopsis oubie (Guérin-Méneville, 1849)
Bunaeopsis phidias (Weymer, 1909)
Campimoptilum kuntzei (Dewitz, 1881)
Cirina forda (Westwood, 1849)
Epiphora antinorii (Oberthür, 1880)
Epiphora bauhiniae (Guérin-Méneville, 1832)
Gonimbrasia belina (Westwood, 1849)
Gonimbrasia ukerewensis (Rebel, 1922)
Gynanisa maja (Klug, 1836)
Holocerina smilax (Westwood, 1849)
Lobobunaea phaedusa (Drury, 1782)
Pseudobunaea epithyrena (Maassen & Weymer, 1885)
Usta terpsichore (Maassen & Weymer, 1885)
Yatanga smithi (Holland, 1892)

Sphingidae
Acherontia atropos (Linnaeus, 1758)
Agrius convolvuli (Linnaeus, 1758)
Andriasa contraria Walker, 1856
Basiothia medea (Fabricius, 1781)
Cephonodes hylas (Linnaeus, 1771)
Cephonodes trochilus (Guérin-Méneville, 1843)
Ceridia heuglini (C. & R. Felder, 1874)
Chaerocina jordani Berio, 1938
Hippotion celerio (Linnaeus, 1758)
Hippotion dexippus Fawcett, 1915
Hippotion rebeli Rothschild & Jordan, 1903
Hippotion roseipennis (Butler, 1882)
Lophostethus dumolinii (Angas, 1849)
Nephele accentifera (Palisot de Beauvois, 1821)
Nephele vau (Walker, 1856)
Rufoclanis rosea (Druce, 1882)
Theretra cajus (Cramer, 1777)
Theretra capensis (Linnaeus, 1764)

Tortricidae
Cryptophlebia peltastica (Meyrick, 1921)

Zygaenidae
Saliunca ignicincta de Joannis, 1912

References

External links 

Eritrea
Eritrea
Moths